Marie-Jean-Eudes Ecological Reserve is an ecological reserve in Quebec, Canada. It was established on April 15, 1992. It is located near La Mauricie National Park, northwest of the city of Shawinigan.

References

External links
 Official website from Government of Québec

Protected areas of Mauricie
Nature reserves in Quebec
Protected areas established in 1992
1992 establishments in Quebec